St. Anselm's Church may refer to:

St. Anselm's Church (Lafayette, California), United States
St. Anselm's Church (Bronx, New York), United States
St. Anselm's Catholic Church, Rectory and Parish Hall, Anselmo, Nebraska, United States
St Anselm's Church, Pembury, Kent, United Kingdom
St Anselm's Church, Kennington, London, United Kingdom
St Anselm's Church, Southall, London, United Kingdom

See also
 Saint Anselm's (disambiguation)
 Saint Anselm Abbey (New Hampshire)
 Saint Anselm's Abbey (Washington, D.C.)
 St. Anselm's Cemetery, Wrought-Iron Cross Site, Berwick, North Dakota, NRHP-listed